Georg Fleischhauer (born 21 October 1988) is a German track and field athlete who specialises in the 400 metres hurdles and bobsledder.

Achievements

References

External links

1988 births
Living people
People from Halberstadt
People from Bezirk Magdeburg
German male hurdlers
Sportspeople from Saxony-Anhalt
21st-century German people